Wolfgang Helbich (8 April 1943 – 8 April 2013) was a German church musician, a choral conductor and academic. He was the founder of the Alsfelder Vokalensemble and served as their conductor for decades, a group that toured internationally and received awards for their recordings. After retiring as a church musician, he also conducted the Bremer RathsChor.

Life 
Born in Berlin, Wolfgang Helbich studied music pedagogy and church music at the Musikhochschule Berlin and Musikhochschule Detmold. From 1969, he was church musician (Kantor) in Alsfeld. He founded in 1971 the Alsfelder Vokalensemble and conducted the vocal ensemble until his death. In Bremen, he focused on performances of oratorios of the 18th and 19th centuries. He initiated an annual Musiknacht (Night of music) devoted to a specific composer.

From 1974, Helbich recorded with the Alsfelder Vokalensemble and the Bremer Domchor numerous award-winning programs. They recorded apocryphal works by Johann Sebastian Bach in several volumes, including the cantata Uns ist ein Kind geboren, BWV 142.

Helbich was invited to conduct all over Europe, the US, Japan and Israel. He edited choral and organ works which were partly not published before. He was professor of choral conducting at the Hochschule für Künste Bremen and as a guest professor at the Musikhochschule Saarbrücken.

After his retirement, Helbich also conducted the Bremer RathsChor, founded in 2008 and including several former members of the Bremer Domchor. They performed demanding choral literature in performances that were regularly aired by Radio Bremen and Deutschlandradio Kultur. Helbich died in Kassel. He was succeeded in Alsfeld and for the Bremer RathsChor by Jan Hübner.

Awards 
Helbich received the Preis der deutschen Schallplattenkritik for his 2002 recording of Ein deutsches Requiem by Johannes Brahms with the Bremer Domchor and the Kammer Sinfonie Bremen.

Recordings 
Recordings by Helbich are held by the German National Library:
 Johann Stamitz: Missa solemnis in D major for soloists, choir and orchestra. cpo 1998
 Jubilate Deo. Polygram, Hamburg 1998
 Mendelssohn: Elias. Hilger Kespohl, Bünde 1999
 Georg Schumann: Geistliche Musik der Spätromantik. Horst Brauner, Berlin 1999
 Joseph von Eybler: Christmas Oratorio (Die Hirten bei der Krippe zu Bethlehem) cpo 1999
 Brahms: Ein deutsches Requiem. Musikproduktion Dabringhaus & Grimm (MDG), Detmold 2002 (Preis der deutschen Schallplattenkritik)
 Karl Martin Reinthaler: Jephta und seine Tochter. cpo 2004
 Weihnachten im Bremer Dom. cpo 2006
 The Sacred Apocryphal Bach Cantatas (cantatas, masses, motets) cpo 1992–2012

References

External links 
 
 Sigrid Schuer: Letzte Ehre für Wolfgang Helbich Weser-Kurier 18 April 2013
 Ortrun Helbich: Wolfgang Helbich Lebenswerk
 Quicklebendiges Biotop in der Kirchenmusik / 150 Jahre Bremer Domchor klassik-heute.com
 Wolfgang Helbich (Conductor) Bach Cantatas Website
 

German classical organists
German male organists
German choral conductors
German male conductors (music)
Academic staff of the Hochschule für Musik Saar
1943 births
2013 deaths
Academic staff of the University of the Arts Bremen
Male classical organists